Foel Goch is a mountain in north-east Wales, and forms part of the Arenig mountain range. It is the only member of the Arenig group that lies outside of the Snowdonia National Park.

The summit is grassy and is marked by a trig point, cairn and a boundary stone. Glacial erratics litter its slopes, with a large one located in Cwm Da. To the west is Carnedd y Filiast and Arenig Fach, while to the south west is Arenig Fawr and Mynydd Nodol. To the south is Aran Fawddwy and to the south east is Cadair Berwyn and Cyrniau Nod.

References

Marilyns of Wales
Hewitts of Wales
Nuttalls
Llangwm, Conwy
Mountains and hills of Conwy County Borough
Llandderfel